The men's +100 kilograms (Heavyweight) competition at the 2018 Asian Games in Jakarta was held on 31 August at the Jakarta Convention Center Assembly Hall.

Kim Sung-min of South Korea won the gold medal.

Schedule
All times are Western Indonesia Time (UTC+07:00)

Results

Main bracket

Repechage

References

External links
Official website
Official website

M101
Judo at the Asian Games Men's Heavyweight